The red weaver (Anaplectes jubaensis) is a species of bird in the weaver family Ploceidae. It is found in southern Somalia and northeastern Kenya.

This species was formerly considered as a subspecies of the red-headed weaver (Anaplectes rubriceps). It was split from the red-headed weaver based on its distinctive plumage.

References 

red weaver
red weaver
Birds of East Africa